The Rodney family of Delaware was a prominent family of farmers and politicians in Kent County and Sussex County, Delaware. It includes a Signer of the Declaration of Independence, a member of the Continental Congress, three Governors of Delaware, a United States Senator, and two United States Representatives. 

William Rodney (or Rodeney) came to Philadelphia soon after William Penn and having settled at St. Jones Hundred, near what later became Dover, Delaware, was foreman of a Kent County jury in December 1681. The eldest of six children, he was baptized in Bristol, England on December 14, 1660. His father worked as a Royal prosecutor and surveyor of customs in New York, dying on Long Island Sound in 1679, while returning from the West Indies.

William Rodney m. 1) Mary Hollyman
William Rodney, m. Ruth Curtis
John Rodney, m. Ruth Hunn
John
Thomas
Daniel Rodney (1764–1846), Governor of Delaware, m. Sarah Fisher (daughter of Henry Fisher)
Hannah (1794–1828), m. Dr. John White
George B. Rodney (1803–1883), U. S. Representative from Delaware
George B. Rodney, Jr. (1842-1927)
John
William
Henry Fisher (1800–1869), m. Mary Burton
Nicholas
Susan
Mary
Caleb Rodney (1767–1840), Governor of Delaware, m. Elizabeth West (1771–1812)
Hannah (1807–1889), m. Laban L. Lyons
Hester, m. Dr. Henry Fisher Hall
Penelope, m. Caleb S. Layton
Eliza, m. Landreth
Daniel
William Rodney m. 2) Sarah Jones
Caesar Rodney (1707–1745) m. Elizabeth Crawford (daughter of the Rev. Thomas Crawford)
Caesar Rodney (1728–1784), Signer of the Declaration of Independence, Continental Congressman, and President of Delaware
Thomas Rodney (1744–1811), U. S. Representative from Delaware, m. Elizabeth Fisher
Caesar Augustus Rodney (1772–1824), U.S. Senator from Delaware, m. Susan Hunn (daughter of Capt. John Hunn)
Lavinia
William Rodney, m. ?
Letitia

Footnotes

References

American families of English ancestry
Rodney
Rodney